James Brown (born 1957, Santa Clara, California) is an American novelist who has also written short fiction and nonfiction.

His third memoir, Apology to the Young Addict, is the last of a trilogy dealing with addiction, recovery, and helping others achieve sobriety.  His acclaimed first memoir, The Los Angeles Diaries (HarperCollins, 2003), is an intimate portrait of his dysfunctional family, covering his childhood, Hollywood script meetings, his splintered marriage and life with his older brother, the actor Barry Brown (1951–78), and his sister, the actress Marilyn Brown (1953–97), who both committed suicide. It was named a Best Book of the Year by Publishers Weekly, The San Francisco Chronicle and The Independent of London.  Brown and Patrick O'Neil co-authored, Writing Your Way to Recovery: How Stories Can Save Our Lives, a book on utilizing creative writing techniques in the drug and alcohol recovery community.

Novels and memoir
Living in San Jose, Brown studied creative writing at San Francisco State University and then attended the University of California, Irvine where he received an MFA degree in creative writing.  His first novel, Going Fast , published in a limited edition by Border Mountain Press, was reviewed by Merritt Clifton in Samisdat:
"Going nowhere at  bored and frustrated with school, aware of the world's flaws but feeling helpless to correct them, James Brown's hero/narrator, Virgil, idly picks up a spray paint can and says in bold script what he thinks of it all, on the side of an abandoned building. Accosted by two burly policement, in an instant he is Going Fast. First to reform school, where he meets JT, a confirmed incorrigible. Then into a low-paying, grimy job, living in the San Jose slum. Learning from JT, becoming his partner, Virg gradually claims his own destiny and identity, through ten rapidly moving, freewheeling days in and around San Francisco drug traffic... There are no bad or good guys, angels or devils, only people, who can be and often are both."

His second novel, Hot Wire, focuses on the struggles of a waitress and her three sons. The semi-autobiographical Final Performance (Sceptre, 1988), about two brothers in Los Angeles, was reviewed in Library Journal by Kimberly G. Allen, who commented, "Its characters imbued with an honest emotional depth, this work is compelling and profoundly moving."

He followed with The Second Story Theatre and Two Encores (Story Line collecting together a novella and  short stories, "The Rat Boy" and "The Friend." His novel Lucky Town (Harcourt,  follows a young boy who runs away from a foster home to meet his ex-con father. When The Los Angeles Diaries was published by HarperCollins in 2003, Publishers Weekly reviewed:
"Brown's tales are harrowing: at five, he and his mother traveled from their San Jose home to San Francisco, where she set an apartment building ablaze. Arson couldn't be proven, but she was imprisoned for tax evasion. At nine, he shared his first drink and high with his siblings; when he was 12, a neighbor attempted to molest him; by 30 he was an alcohol- and cocaine-addicted writer-in-residence. During his marriage's early years, Brown often left his wife to feed his addictions, repeatedly promising her he'd reform. Desperate to fuel his writing career, he attempted screenwriting, but everything he pitched seemed too dark. Brown's genius compels readers to sympathize with him in every instance. Juxtaposed with the shimmery unreality of Hollywood, these essays bitterly explore real life, an existence careening between great promise and utter devastation. Brown's revelations have no smugness or self-congratulation; they reek of remorse and desire, passion and futility. Brown flays open his own tortured skin looking for what blood beats beneath and why. The result is a grimly exquisite memoir that reads like a noir novel but grips unrelentingly like the hand of a homeless drunk begging for help."

His personal essays have appeared in GQ, The New York Times Magazine, The Los Angeles Times Magazine and Ploughshares. His writing has also been featured in Denver Quarterly and New England Review. He has been anthologized in Best American Sports Writing of 2006, Fathers and Sons and Sports: An Anthology of Great American Sports Writing (ESPN, 2008).

This River (Counterpoint Books, 2011) is a continuation of The Los Angeles Diaries, picking up where the first memoir ended with many of the same themes of family, addiction and recovery. Now in its fifth edition, Counterpoint is also reissuing the trade paperback of Los Angeles Diaries with a new introduction.

Brown's third memoir, Apology to the Young Addict (Counterpoint Books, 2020), is the last of a trilogy.  His publisher describes it as follows: "Now sixty ― with years of sobriety under his belt―and the father of three sons, James Brown writes about finding a new path in life, making peace with the family whose ghosts have haunted him, and helping the next generation of addicts overcome their disease. Opening with the tragic tale of an elderly couple consumed by opioid addiction and moving through the horrors of a Las Vegas massacre, these essays draw on Brown’s personal journey of recovery to illustrate how an individual life, in all its messiness and charm, can offer a blueprint for healing. Evocative and hopeful, Apology to the Young Addict is a reinvention of the recovery memoir and a lasting testimony from a master writing at his peak."  Author Jerry Stahl (Permanent Midnight) states: "James Brown’s Apology to the Young Addict does not just breathe new life into addiction writing, it does so with enough grace, heart, and grab-you-by-the-throat style to transcend the genre and qualify as genuine literature. These beautiful essays will serve as balm for survivors of the opioid crisis, those still struggling to make it out, and pretty much anyone else trying to stay sane in these insane times. Prose-wise―with all due respect to his late namesake―James Brown has earned his title as the Godfather of Junkie Soul."

Awards
Brown received the Nelson Algren Award for Short Fiction, a National Endowment for the Arts Fellowship in fiction writing and a Chesterfield Film Writing Fellowship from Universal/Amblin Entertainment. He was a visiting fellow at the Bread Loaf Writers' Conference and the Sewanee Writers' Conference.   

He teaches at California State University, San Bernardino and lives with his wife, Paula Priamos-Brown, in Lake Arrowhead, California.

Bibliography
Going Fast (Border Mountain Press, 1977)
Hot Wire (Arbor House, 1985)
Final Performance (Sceptre, 1988)
The Second Story Theatre and Two Encores (Story Line Press, 1994)
Lucky Town (Harcourt, 1994)
The Los Angeles Diaries (HarperCollins, 2003)
This River (Counterpoint Books, 2011)
Apology to the Young Addict (Counterpoint Books, 2020)
Writing Your Way to Recovery: How Stories Can Save Our Lives (co-authored with Patrick O'Neil, 2021)

References

External links
http://www.jamesbrownauthor.com
  (2008 audio-video)
 Review of The Los Angeles Diaries by Entertainment Weekly
 "The Screenwriter", short story in Underground Voices, originally in The Cocaine Chronicles (Akashic Books, 2005)
 

1957 births
20th-century American novelists
American memoirists
Living people
Writers from California
21st-century American novelists
American male novelists
American male short story writers
20th-century American short story writers
21st-century American short story writers
People from Lake Arrowhead, California
20th-century American male writers
21st-century American male writers
San Francisco State University alumni
20th-century American non-fiction writers
21st-century American non-fiction writers
American male non-fiction writers